Rafiqul Hossain ( - 10 February 2016) is a Jatiya Party (Ershad) politician and the former Member of Parliament of Comilla-10.

Career
Hossain was elected to parliament from Comilla-10 as a Jatiya Party candidate in 1986 and 1988.

Death
Hossain died on 10 February 2016 in Labaid Hospital, Dhaka, Bangladesh.

References

Jatiya Party politicians
2016 deaths
3rd Jatiya Sangsad members
1936 births